Michael III of Anchialus, (? – March 1178) was Patriarch of Constantinople from January 1170 to March 1178.

Michael was appointed patriarch by the Byzantine emperor Manuel I Komnenos, culminating what had been a highly distinguished intellectual and administrative career. Before becoming Patriarch, Michael III had held a progression of important church administrative offices, including referendarios, epi tou sakelliou, and protekdikos, the last of which was in charge of the tribunal which adjudicated claims for asylum within the Great Church. The most important of his appointments before receiving the Patriarchal throne was the office of hýpatos tōn philosóphōn ("chief of the philosophers"), a title given to the head of the imperial University of Constantinople in the 11th–14th centuries. In this role he condemned the neoplatonist philosophers, and encouraged study of Aristotle's work on the natural sciences as an antidote. As Patriarch, Michael III continued to deal with the theological issue of the relation between the Son and the Father in the Holy Trinity. The issue was created due to the explanation that one Demetrius of Lampi (in Phrygia) gave to the phrase of the Gospel of John , which means my Father is bigger than me (John, XIV.29). Michael acted as the Emperor's chief spokesman on this issue. Michael also ordered a review of Eastern Orthodox ecclesiastical and imperial laws and decrees by Theodore Balsamon known as the "Scholia" (Greek: Σχόλια) (c. 1170).

Michael's patriarchy was marked by the Emperor Manuel's attempts to forge a union with the Catholic Church. Continuing a longstanding papal policy, Alexander III demanded recognition of their religious authority over all Christians everywhere, and wished themselves to reach superiority over the Byzantine Emperor; they were not at all willing to fall into a state of dependence from one emperor to the other. Manuel, on the other side, wanted an official recognition of his secular authority over both East and West. Such conditions would not be accepted by either side. Even if a pro-western Emperor such as Manuel agreed to it, the Greek citizens of the Empire would have rejected outright any union of this sort, as they did almost three hundred years later when the Orthodox and Catholic churches were briefly united under the Pope. In existing correspondence Michael presents a deeply courteous but unbending position on the authority of his Church. The correspondence also show a good working relationship with the Emperor.

Some of Michael III's correspondence with Manuel I survive, as does his inaugural address as hýpatos. Other documents including correspondence with Pope Alexander III have been attributed to him, though they are more likely later apocryphal creations of the 13th century. Michael III can also take credit for acting as patron to the young Michael Choniates, who composed an encomium in his honour, still extant.

References

Sources
Οικουμενικό Πατριαρχείο
J. M. Hussey. The Orthodox Church in the Byzantine Empire. Oxford: University Press, 1986.
 

 

12th-century patriarchs of Constantinople
People from Pomorie
Officials of Manuel I Komnenos
1178 deaths